The Albury Botanic Gardens are a botanical garden located in the city of Albury, New South Wales, Australia. The garden was established in 1877 and forms an example of the mainstream ideas about gardening in the 19th and 20th centuries.

The garden is maintained by the municipality of Albury and provides free entrance.

External links
 https://archive.today/20160509173349/http://www.alburycity.nsw.gov.au/leisure-and-culture/parks-and-playgrounds/albury-botanic-gardens
Albury City: Botanic Gardens

Botanical gardens in New South Wales
Albury, New South Wales
1877 establishments in Australia